Hanumanthagowda Krishnegowda Patil (born 15 August 1953) is an Indian politician from Gadag in Karnataka, India. He was the Minister for Rural Development and Panchayat Raj in the Government of Karnataka headed by Siddaramaiah. He currently represents the Gadag Assembly Constituency in Karnataka Legislative Assembly. He is the son of Late Sri. K. H. Patil, a renowned politician and former Minister for Co-operation, Government of Karnataka. Popularly known as Tiger of Hulkoti, Patil got widespread accolades for enthusiastically involving himself with the expansion of Irrigation across the state and spearheading the attempt for Cloud Seeding while being the Minister for Water Resources of Karnataka. A veteran Congressman, he was also the Minister for textiles  major irrigation,   agriculture and Law and Parliamentary Affairs,  Government of Karnataka and Leader of Opposition and Member of Karnataka Legislative Council. During his term as Minister for Rural Development and Panchayat Raj, Government of Karnataka, Karnataka bagged the E-Award instituted by the Centre for effective use of Information and Communication Technology (ICT) in the Panchayat Raj department for the year 2015-16. Prime Minister Narendra Modi presented the award on 24 April 2017 in Lucknow during an event to mark National Panchayat Raj Day. His Rural Development and Panchayat Raj, Government of Karnataka  department won National awards successively for record 4 years from 2014-15 to 2017-18.

References

1953 births
Living people
State cabinet ministers of Karnataka
Karnataka MLAs 2008–2013
Leaders of the Opposition in the Karnataka Legislative Council
People from Gadag district
Indian National Congress politicians from Karnataka